The eighth edition of the South American Championship was held in Montevideo, Uruguay from 12 October to 2 November 1924.

Overview

CONMEBOL asked the Paraguayan Football Association to organize it, but it refused because they lacked the infrastructure for such an event. However, the association did organize it, but by way of honouring the recent Paris 1924 gold-medallists, Uruguay, it was held there.

The participating countries were Argentina, Chile, Paraguay and Uruguay. Brazil withdrew from the tournament.

Squads
For a complete list of participants squads see: 1924 South American Championship squads

Venues

Final round
Each team played one match against each of the other teams. Two points were awarded for a win, one point for a draw and zero points for a defeat.

Result

Goal scorers

4 goals
  Pedro Petrone

2 goals
  Ildefonso López
  Ángel Romano

1 goals

  Gabino Sosa
  Juan Loyarte 
  David Arellano
  Gerardo Rivas
  Pasiano Urbita 
  José Cea
  Pedro Zingone

External links
 South American Championship 1924 at RSSSF

 
1924
1924
1924 in South American football
1924 in Chile
1924 in Argentine football
1924 in Uruguayan football
1924 in Paraguayan football
October 1924 sports events
November 1924 sports events
Sports competitions in Montevideo
1920s in Montevideo